Jacob Willem "Wim" Cohen (27 August 1923 Leeuwarden – 12 November 2000) was a Dutch mathematician, well known for over hundred scientific publications and several books in queueing theory.

Cohen was born in a Jewish family, as the son of Benjamin Cohen and Aaltje Klein. Having acquired an autodidact knowledge of mathematics while in hiding during World War II, Cohen got an Engineer's degree (1949) and Ph.D. degree (1955) in mechanical engineering at Delft University, on a dissertation entitled Stress Calculations in Helicoidal Shells and Propeller Blades. He worked as teletraffic engineer with the Telecommunications group at  Philips (1950–57), at the applied mathematics department at Delft (1957–73) and  University of Utrecht (1973-1998).  He was buried in Haifa.

Books
The single server queue (1969)
Statistical Power Analysis for the Behavioural Sciences (Academic Press, 1969)
On regenerative processes in queueing theory
Boundary value problems in queueing systems (Elsevier, 1983).  Editor with Onno J. Boxma.
Analysis of random walks (IOS Press, 1992)

Awards
Hollandsche Maatschappij der Wetenschappen  AKZO prize (1986)
honorary doctorate from the Technion (1988)
honorary member of the International Advisory Committee of the International Teletraffic Congress.
ITC Lifetime Achievement Award by the International Advisory Committee of the International Teletraffic Congress (1997).

References

Queueing theorists
Delft University of Technology alumni
Academic staff of the Delft University of Technology
Dutch Jews
Academic staff of Utrecht University
People from Leeuwarden
1923 births
2000 deaths
20th-century Dutch mathematicians